Yasser Desai (born 15 November 1989) is an Indian singer-songwriter currently working in Bollywood. He came into the limelight with his songs "Hue Bechain" and "Aankhon Me Aasoon Leke" from 2017 film Ek Haseena Thi Ek Deewana Tha. Desai made his Bollywood debut with 2016 film Beiimaan Love, in which he sang three songs- “Main Adhoora", in "Mere Peeche Hindustan" and “RangReza" (Male). Subsequently he sang many blockbuster songs like "Dil Ko Karaar Aaya", "Hue Bechain", "Aankhon Me Aansoon Leke", Dil maang Raha Hai, Pallo Latke, Makhna, Jeene Bhi De, Naino Ne Baandhi, Jitni Dafa, Jogi, Twist Kamariya, Mehbooba, Rang Dariya and many more.

Early life and background 
Yasser Desai was born on 15 November 1989 in Mumbai, Maharashtra. He started his journey in music from the age of 11. He made his Bollywood singing debut with the 2016 film 'Beiimaan Love'. He sung two songs from that movie called "Main Adhoora" along with "Aakanksha Sharma" and the other one, "Mere Peeche Hindustaan Hai", along with Sukriti Kakar. He has sung the song called 'Itna Tumhe Chahna Hai' from the movie 'Machine' which was a smash hit. He lent his voice in many web series and TV series like 'Zakhmi', 'Bade Bhaiya Ki Dulhan', 'Dil Sambhal Jaa Zara' and so on. He made his Gujarati singing debut with a song titled "Tharva De" from the 2017 Gujarati movie Rachna No Dabbo? He made his Bengali singing debut with the song "Aalto Chhuye" from the 2018 movie Girlfriend. The song was composed by the very famous Jeet Gannguli. In the 2018 movie Gold, he had two songs called "Naino Ne Baandhi" and "Mono Beena". He won the "Best Playback Singer Of The Year" in the Zee Cine Awards 2019 for the song "Naino Ne Baandhi". Till now he had sung more than 200 songs for many Bollywood movies. He has also sung several singles for Zee Music Company and many other music channels.

Filmography

Film

Single

Awards and nominations

References

External links 

Living people
Indian singer-songwriters
1989 births